Natascha Hiltrop (born 18 July 1992) is a German Paralympic sport shooter. She represented Germany at the Summer Paralympics in 2012, 2016 and 2021. She won the gold medal in the mixed 10 metre air rifle prone SH1 event at the 2020 Summer Paralympics held in Tokyo, Japan. She also won the silver medal in the mixed 10 metre air rifle prone SH1 event in 2016.

In 2018, she became the European champion at the 2018 World Shooting Para Sport European Championships held in Belgrade, Serbia.

References

External links 
 
 

1992 births
Living people
German female sport shooters
Paralympic shooters of Germany
Paralympic gold medalists for Germany
Paralympic silver medalists for Germany
Paralympic medalists in shooting
Shooters at the 2012 Summer Paralympics
Shooters at the 2016 Summer Paralympics
Shooters at the 2020 Summer Paralympics
Medalists at the 2016 Summer Paralympics
Medalists at the 2020 Summer Paralympics
Place of birth missing (living people)
21st-century German women